Ladan-Kara (also Kayragach) is a village in Suzak District, Jalal-Abad Region, Kyrgyzstan. Its population was 8,886 in 2021.

Population

References
 

Populated places in Jalal-Abad Region